John Allan (22 March 1931 – 16 June 2003) was a footballer who played in the Scottish Football League for Dunfermline Athletic, Aberdeen and Third Lanark, and in The Football League for Bradford Park Avenue and Halifax Town.

References

1931 births
2003 deaths
Footballers from Stirling
Scottish footballers
Association football forwards
Dunfermline Athletic F.C. players
Aberdeen F.C. players
Third Lanark A.C. players
Bradford (Park Avenue) A.F.C. players
Halifax Town A.F.C. players
Weymouth F.C. players
Brechin City F.C. players
Scottish Football League players
English Football League players